Jürg Laederach (20 December 1945 – 19 March 2018) was a Swiss writer. 

Jürg Laederach was an author of experimental prose as well as plays and radio plays. He has also distinguished himself as a translator from English and French.

Awards 
 1997 Austrian State Prize for European Literature
 2005 Italo Svevo Award

Works
 Einfall der Dämmerung, Frankfurt am Main 1974
 Im Verlauf einer langen Erinnerung, Frankfurt am Main 1977
 Das ganze Leben, Frankfurt am Main 1978
 Die Lehrerin verspricht der Negerin wärmere Tränen, Frankfurt am Main 1978
 Ein milder Winter, Frankfurt am Main 1978
 Wittgenstein in Graz, Frankfurt am Main 1979
 Das Buch der Klagen, Frankfurt am Main 1980
 Fahles Ende kleiner Begierden, Frankfurt am Main 1981
 Proper operation, Frankfurt am Main 1981
 69 Arten den Blues zu spielen, Frankfurt am Main 1984
 Tod eines Kellners, Frankfurt am Main 1984 (with Andres Müry)
 Flugelmeyers Wahn, Frankfurt am Main 1986
 Körper brennen, Graz 1986 (with Andres Müry)
 Sigmund oder Der Herr der Seelen tötet seine, Frankfurt am Main 1986
 Vor Schrecken starr, Frankfurt am Main 1988
 Der zweite Sinn oder Unsentimentale Reise durch ein Feld Literatur, Frankfurt am Main 1988
 China, Frankfurt am Main 1990
 Emanuel, Frankfurt am Main 1990
 Passion, Frankfurt am Main 1993
 Eccentric, Kunst und Leben, Frankfurt am Main 1994
 Schattenmänner, Frankfurt am Main 1994
 Über Robert Walser, Salzburg u.a. 1997 (with William H. Gass)
 Portrait, Baden/Schweiz 1998 (with Felix von Muralt)
 In Hackensack, Basel u.a. 2003

Editor 
 Adolf Wölfli: "0 Grad 0/000! Entbrantt von Liebes,=Flammen", Frankfurt am Main 1996

Sources 
 Dariusz Komorowski: Bewegungsästhetik in den Romanen von Jürg Laederach, Würzburg 2002.

References

External links

 Jürg Laederach – Editor 

1945 births
2018 deaths
Swiss male novelists
20th-century Swiss novelists
21st-century Swiss novelists
20th-century male writers
21st-century male writers
Writers from Basel-Stadt